Kother or Köther is a German surname. Notable people with the surname include:

 Karl Köther (cyclist, born 1905), German cyclist 
 Karl Köther (cyclist, born 1942), German cyclist, son of the above
Rosemarie Gabriel (née Kother in 1956), German swimmer

German-language surnames